The Milo Open Cali (formerly Seguros Bolívar Open Cali) was a tennis tournament held in Cali, Colombia. The event is part of the ATP Challenger Tour and was played on outdoor clay courts.

Past finals

Singles

Doubles

External links 
Official website 
ITF search

ATP Challenger Tour
 
Clay court tennis tournaments
Tennis tournaments in Colombia
Recurring sporting events established in 2008
2008 establishments in Colombia
Sport in Cali